Thallophycoides is an undifferentiated, globular, non-mineralized alga from the Ediacaran period.

References

Ediacaran life
Fossil algae